Jody Sveistrup (born 1969) is a Canadian curler.

Awards
British Columbia Sports Hall of Fame: inducted in 2002 with all of 2000 Greg McAulay team, Canadian and World champions

Teams

References

External links
 
 Jody Sveistrup – Curling Canada Stats Archive

Living people
Canadian male curlers
Curlers from British Columbia
World curling champions
Brier champions
1969 births